Antonio Calza (1658–1725) was an Italian painter of the Baroque period.

He was born in Verona to a jeweler. He was the pupil of the Bolognese painter Carlo Cignani, then moved to Rome to work under Jacques Courtois. Guglielmo Capodoro (Paganini) and Giovanni Battista Canziani were his pupils. Calza, who worked mostly in Bologna, is known for painting historical and battle paintings.

In 1675, he reconciled with his father, and married an 88-year-old widow. He was to marry three times, the last in 1710 to a painter of flower still lifes.  He painted in Milan for General Martini, and in Vienna for Prince Eugenie, including portraits of the Prince and the Emperor. He died in Verona on April 18, 1725.

References

Original Treatises: Dating from the XIIth to XVIIIth Centuries on the Arts of Painting, in Oil, Miniature, Mosaic, and on Glass; of Gilding, Dyeing, and the Preparation of Colours and Artificial Gems; Preceded by a General Introduction; with Translations, Prefaces, and Notes, By Mary Philadelphia Merrifield, Published by J. Murray, 1849. Page 749.

Sources

1658 births
1714 deaths
Painters from Verona
Painters from Bologna
17th-century Italian painters
Italian male painters
18th-century Italian painters
Italian Baroque painters
Italian battle painters
18th-century Italian male artists